Hacks: The Inside Story (full title: Hacks: The Inside Story of the Break-ins and Breakdowns That Put Donald Trump in the White House) is a 2017 book by Donna Brazile about her time as interim chairperson of the Democratic National Committee during Hillary Clinton's 2016 presidential campaign.

Reception
The book received attention in part for Brazile's claims that the Democratic National Committee acted in favor of Clinton's campaign during the Democratic primaries, to the detriment of Bernie Sanders and his campaign. Brazile also discusses Clinton's collapse in September 2016, and subsequent discussions about replacing her as the Democratic presidential nominee.

Brazile's statements were investigated by The Washington Post, which reported the fundraising agreement which Brazile alleged rigged the 2016 Presidential primaries for Clinton in September 2015 and how Sanders supporters knew about it and ridiculed it after details outside of fundraising were not yet disclosed to the public.

References

2017 non-fiction books
Books about Hillary Clinton
Books about the 2016 United States presidential election
Hillary Clinton 2016 presidential campaign
Hachette Books books